is the 11th studio album by Chara, which was released on February 28, 2007. It debuted at #4 on the Japanese Oricon album charts, and charted in the top 300 for 8 weeks.

Union was her first album with Universal Music, after releasing music with Sony since 1991. It was released in two versions: a limited edition CD+DVD version, as well as a regular CD Only version. The DVD featured the music videos for the three singles, "Sekai", Crazy for You and Fantasy.

Sekai, released  months before the album, was Chara's first release under Universal. It was used in commercials for the NTT docomo service "NEC N702is" cellphone. The second single, Crazy for You, was created in collaboration with Shibuya-kei DJ Tomoyuki Tanaka (i.e. Fantastic Plastic Machine) and The Brilliant Green guitarist Ryo Matsui. Tanaka produced the song, while Matsui wrote the music.

Fantasy, the third single preceding the album's release by a month, was a minor hit for Chara. It was used in Kanebo cosmetics commercials for their T'estimo eye-makeup range, featuring Chara as a spokesperson in the commercials. It was a collaboration between Chara and music producer Seiji Kameda, bassist for the band Tokyo Jihen. It managed to reach #13 on Oricon's single charts.

The final track of the album, was used as the theme song for the Japanese film .

Track listing

Singles

Japan Sales Rankings

Various charts

References
 	

Chara (singer) albums
2007 albums
Dream pop albums by Japanese artists